G. V. Dhanalakshmi  is an Indian athlete. She won a silver medal in  4 × 100 m relay  in the 1994 Asian Games.

References

Athletes (track and field) at the 1994 Asian Games
Asian Games competitors for India
Asian Games silver medalists for India
Asian Games medalists in athletics (track and field)
Indian female sprinters